Juan José Pacho Burgos (born 8 April 1963 in Oxkutzcab, Mexico), is a Mexican former baseball player and manager.

Career
Pacho played as a shortstop for the Mexican League. For 19 seasons, he played for the Leones de Yucatán, then in 1984 for the Diablos Rojos del México, from 1985-2002 he came back to Yucatán team.

Pacho's average was 0.278 in 1891 games. In 6370 turns to the bat, he produced 1768 hits, 202 doubles, 27 triples, 14 home runs, producing 528, scoring 806 and received 517 bases.

Pacho was member in his childhood of the Yucatan state team representing virtually every competition at national level, from teenager to young adult.

He mentioned once to newspapers: "in my village, there were only two things to do on Sundays, that is going to church and playing baseball".

In 2005, Pacho was the Manager of the Mexican team Venados de Mazatlán and the team under his leadership won the Caribbean Series beating the Águilas Cibaeñas from Dominican Republic.

In 2015, Juan Jose Pacho is the manager of the winter Mexican team Venados de Mazatlán and under his leadership won the 2016 Caribbean Series to the Tigres de Aragua from Venezuela.

In 2009, he was inducted into the Mexican Professional Baseball Hall of Fame for his achievements in baseball as a professional athlete.

References

External links

1963 births
Living people
Batavia Trojans players
Buffalo Bisons (minor league) players
Caribbean Series managers
Charleston Charlies players
Chattanooga Lookouts players
Diablos Rojos del México players
Glens Falls White Sox players
Greenville Braves players
Leones de Yucatán players
Mexican Baseball Hall of Fame inductees
Mexican expatriate baseball players in the United States
Mexican League baseball managers
Minor league baseball managers
Richmond Braves players
Sportspeople from Yucatán (state)
Venados de Mazatlán players
Waterloo Indians players